Serkan Basha (born 21 January 2000) is an Albanian professional footballer who plays as a midfielder for Belgian club RFC Seraing.

Career statistics

Club

Notes

References

2000 births
Living people
Albanian footballers
Albanian expatriate footballers
Association football midfielders
KF Tirana players
R.F.C. Seraing (1922) players
Kategoria e Parë players
Belgian Third Division players
Challenger Pro League players
Albanian expatriate sportspeople in Belgium
Expatriate footballers in Belgium